Doto xangada is a species of sea slug, a nudibranch, a marine gastropod mollusc in the family Dotidae.

Distribution
This species was first described from four specimens collected at Caleta James, Santiago, Galapagos Islands.

Description
This nudibranch is white with pink purple to reddish brown digestive gland showing through the skin. The cerata have large globular tubercles which are white.

EcologyDoto xangada'' was found associated with small thecate hydroids at low water mark.

References

Dotidae
Gastropods described in 2010